The following is a comprehensive list of the episodes from Channel 4 impressions series Bo' Selecta!.

Episode list

Series 1 (2002)

Series 2 (2003)

Christmas Specials (2003)

Series 3 (2004)

Christmas Specials (2004)

Series 4: A Bear's Tail (2005)
A Bear's Tail forms part of the Bo' Selecta narrative and is therefore considered the next series in the timeline.

Christmas Special (2005)

Series 5: Bo! in the USA (2006)

Special (2009)

References

Lists of British comedy television series episodes
Lists of British LGBT-related television series episodes